LUS or lus can refer to:
 Latymer Upper School
 Mizo language ISO 639 code
 Lower Uterine Segment http://onlinelibrary.wiley.com/wol1/doi/10.1002/dc.2840120315/abstract